The Lostener See is a lake in West Mecklenburg, Mecklenburg-Vorpommern, Germany. At an elevation of 35.9 m, its surface area is 0.22 km².

Lakes of Mecklenburg-Western Pomerania